Bold Right Life is the third studio album by the American singer Kierra Sheard. It was released by EMI Gospel on 27 October 2008.

Critical reception

AllMusic editor Pemberton Roach found that the album "reveals that the younger Clark is more than up to carrying on the family legacy. Produced by Kierra's Brother J. Drew, the album is a thoroughly modern slice of hip-hop-ish R&B, replete with skittering dance beats, funky bass lines, and vocals altered with all sorts of up-to-date computer effects. Sailing above it all are Sheard’s powerful and assured vocals, at once secularly soulful and full of the Spirit." Kenya M. Yarbrough of EURweb reviewed the album favorably.

Accolades 
The album was nominated for a Dove Award for Urban Album of the Year at the 40th GMA Dove Awards.

Chart performance 
Bold Right Life debuted and peaked at number 114 on the US Billboard 200. It also reached number three on the Top Gospel Albums and number none on the Top Christian Albums. The lead single, "Praise Him Now", peaked at number nine on the Hot Gospel Songs and "Love Like Crazy" reached number 57 on the Japan Hot 100.

Track listing

Charts

Weekly charts

Year-end charts

References 

Kierra Sheard albums
2008 albums